The 1984 Pittsburgh Pirates season was the 103rd season of the franchise; the 98th in the National League. This was their 15th season at Three Rivers Stadium. The Pirates finished sixth and last in the National League East with a record of 75–87.

Regular season

Season standings

Record vs. opponents

Game log

|- bgcolor="ffbbbb"
| 1 || April 3 || @ Padres || 1–5 || Show || Rhoden (0–1) || — || 44,553 || 0–1
|- bgcolor="ffbbbb"
| 2 || April 5 || @ Padres || 6–8 || DeLeon || Scurry (0–1) || Gossage || 19,361 || 0–2
|- bgcolor="ccffcc"
| 3 || April 6 || @ Dodgers || 3–1 || Tudor (1–0) || Welch || Guante (1) || 39,820 || 1–2
|- bgcolor="ccffcc"
| 4 || April 7 || @ Dodgers || 3–0 || Candelaria (1–0) || Pena || Robinson (1) || 32,403 || 2–2
|- bgcolor="ccffcc"
| 5 || April 8 || @ Dodgers || 5–2 || Rhoden (1–1) || Valenzuela || Guante (2) || 41,550 || 3–2
|- bgcolor="ffbbbb"
| 6 || April 10 || @ Giants || 3–4 || Krukow || McWilliams (0–1) || Minton || 6,837 || 3–3
|- bgcolor="ffbbbb"
| 7 || April 11 || @ Giants || 1–2 (10) || Lavelle || Guante (0–1) || — || 8,773 || 3–4
|- bgcolor="ffbbbb"
| 8 || April 13 || @ Cardinals || 1–4 || LaPoint || Candelaria (1–1) || Sutter || 45,453 || 3–5
|- bgcolor="ffbbbb"
| 9 || April 14 || @ Cardinals || 5–7 || Cox || Rhoden (1–2) || Sutter || 23,602 || 3–6
|- bgcolor="ffbbbb"
| 10 || April 15 || @ Cardinals || 0–1 || Rucker || McWilliams (0–2) || Sutter || 24,099 || 3–7
|- bgcolor="ffbbbb"
| 11 || April 17 || Phillies || 1–4 || Hudson || Tudor (1–1) || Holland || 34,114 || 3–8
|- bgcolor="ccffcc"
| 12 || April 18 || Phillies || 6–3 || Candelaria (2–1) || Koosman || Robinson (2) || 2,752 || 4–8
|- bgcolor="ffbbbb"
| 13 || April 20 || @ Cubs || 4–5 (10) || Stoddard || Tekulve (0–1) || — || 22,049 || 4–9
|- bgcolor="ccffcc"
| 14 || April 21 || @ Cubs || 8–5 || DeLeon (1–0) || Noles || Robinson (3) || 21,936 || 5–9
|- bgcolor="ccffcc"
| 15 || April 24 || @ Phillies || 3–2 || Candelaria (3–1) || Koosman || Tekulve (1) || 14,096 || 6–9
|- bgcolor="ffbbbb"
| 16 || April 25 || @ Phillies || 7–8 || McGraw || Tunnell (0–1) || Holland || 20,622 || 6–10
|- bgcolor="ccffcc"
| 17 || April 27 || Cubs || 3–2 || Rhoden (2–2) || Rainey || Tekulve (2) || 9,057 || 7–10
|- bgcolor="ffbbbb"
| 18 || April 28 || Cubs || 1–7 || Sanderson || McWilliams (0–3) || — || 17,317 || 7–11
|- bgcolor="ffbbbb"
| 19 || April 29 || Cubs || 1–2 || Trout || Candelaria (3–2) || Smith || 13,397 || 7–12
|- bgcolor="ffbbbb"
| 20 || April 30 || Cardinals || 3–5 || Sutter || Tunnell (0–2) || — || 4,097 || 7–13
|-

|- bgcolor="ffbbbb"
| 21 || May 1 || Cardinals || 5–10 || Andujar || DeLeon (1–1) || — || 3,762 || 7–14
|- bgcolor="ffbbbb"
| 22 || May 2 || Cardinals || 1–3 || LaPoint || Rhoden (2–3) || Sutter || 3,649 || 7–15
|- bgcolor="ccffcc"
| 23 || May 5 || Dodgers || 8–7 (10) || Tekulve (1–1) || Hershiser || — || 18,176 || 8–15
|- bgcolor="ffbbbb"
| 24 || May 6 || Dodgers || 4–6 (10) || Niedenfuer || Tekulve (1–2) || — ||  || 8–16
|- bgcolor="ccffcc"
| 25 || May 6 || Dodgers || 2–1 || Tudor (2–1) || Valenzuela || — || 19,246 || 9–16
|- bgcolor="ccffcc"
| 26 || May 10 || Giants || 4–2 || Rhoden (3–3) || Robinson || Tekulve (3) || 4,002 || 10–16
|- bgcolor="ffbbbb"
| 27 || May 11 || @ Braves || 2–4 (10) || Forster || Tekulve (1–3) || — || 24,586 || 10–17
|- bgcolor="ffbbbb"
| 28 || May 12 || @ Braves || 3–4 || Perez || Guante (0–2) || Dedmon || 41,319 || 10–18
|- bgcolor="ffbbbb"
| 29 || May 13 || @ Braves || 8–9 (10) || Dedmon || Candelaria (3–3) || — || 23,035 || 10–19
|- bgcolor="ccffcc"
| 30 || May 14 || Astros || 3–2 || DeLeon (2–1) || Knepper || Tekulve (4) || 3,790 || 11–19
|- bgcolor="ccffcc"
| 31 || May 15 || Astros || 3–2 (10) || Guante (1–2) || DiPino || — || 2,978 || 12–19
|- bgcolor="ffbbbb"
| 32 || May 16 || Astros || 0–1 || Ryan || Candelaria (3–4) || — || 4,523 || 12–20
|- bgcolor="ccffcc"
| 33 || May 18 || Braves || 6–0 || McWilliams (1–3) || Falcone || — || 10,947 || 13–20
|- bgcolor="ffbbbb"
| 34 || May 19 || Braves || 2–4 (7) || Mahler || Tudor (2–2) || — || 11,989 || 13–21
|- bgcolor="ffbbbb"
| 35 || May 20 || Braves || 1–5 || Bedrosian || Tekulve (1–4) || — || 16,412 || 13–22
|- bgcolor="ffbbbb"
| 36 || May 22 || Reds || 3–5 || Soto || Scurry (0–2) || — || 7,959 || 13–23
|- bgcolor="ccffcc"
| 37 || May 23 || Reds || 7–2 || Candelaria (4–4) || Russell || — || 7,072 || 14–23
|- bgcolor="ccffcc"
| 38 || May 24 || Reds || 5–1 || McWilliams (2–3) || Price || — || 8,580 || 15–23
|- bgcolor="ccffcc"
| 39 || May 25 || @ Astros || 6–2 || Tudor (3–2) || Scott || — || 18,430 || 16–23
|- bgcolor="ffbbbb"
| 40 || May 26 || @ Astros || 0–2 || Ryan || DeLeon (2–2) || — || 39,518 || 16–24
|- bgcolor="ccffcc"
| 41 || May 27 || @ Astros || 2–1 || Rhoden (4–3) || Niekro || Scurry (1) || 18,416 || 17–24
|- bgcolor="ccffcc"
| 42 || May 28 || @ Astros || 7–0 || Candelaria (5–4) || Ruhle || Robinson (4) || 10,952 || 18–24
|- bgcolor="ffbbbb"
| 43 || May 29 || @ Reds || 4–5 (10) || Power || Tekulve (1–5) || — || 10,411 || 18–25
|- bgcolor="ffbbbb"
| 44 || May 30 || @ Reds || 4–6 (14) || Owchinko || Robinson (0–1) || — || 11,608 || 18–26
|- bgcolor="ccffcc"
| 45 || May 31 || Expos || 2–1 || DeLeon (3–2) || Gullickson || — || 6,049 || 19–26
|-

|- bgcolor="ffbbbb"
| 46 || June 1 || Expos || 0–2 || Lea || Rhoden (4–4) || Reardon || 12,691 || 19–27
|- bgcolor="ccffcc"
| 47 || June 2 || Expos || 2–1 || Tunnell (1–2) || Rogers || Tekulve (5) || 19,080 || 20–27
|- bgcolor="ccffcc"
| 48 || June 3 || Expos || 4–0 || Tudor (4–2) || Palmer || — || 19,713 || 21–27
|- bgcolor="ffbbbb"
| 49 || June 4 || Mets || 2–4 || Darling || Robinson (0–2) || Orosco || 13,306 || 21–28
|- bgcolor="ffbbbb"
| 50 || June 5 || Mets || 0–3 || Terrell || DeLeon (3–3) || — || 6,539 || 21–29
|- bgcolor="ffbbbb"
| 51 || June 6 || Mets || 1–2 (13) || Gorman || Scurry (0–3) || — || 7,493 || 21–30
|- bgcolor="ffbbbb"
| 52 || June 8 || @ Phillies || 4–5 || Koosman || Candelaria (5–5) || Holland ||  || 21–31
|- bgcolor="ffbbbb"
| 53 || June 8 || @ Phillies || 1–2 || Gross || McWilliams (2–4) || Holland || 31,133 || 21–32
|- bgcolor="ffbbbb"
| 54 || June 9 || @ Phillies || 5–6 || Carlton || Tudor (4–3) || Holland || 31,981 || 21–33
|- bgcolor="ccffcc"
| 55 || June 10 || @ Phillies || 12–6 (12) || Guante (2–2) || Kern || — || 32,996 || 22–33
|- bgcolor="ffbbbb"
| 56 || June 11 || @ Mets || 1–3 || Gooden || Rhoden (4–5) || Orosco || 19,596 || 22–34
|- bgcolor="ccffcc"
| 57 || June 12 || @ Mets || 6–3 || McWilliams (3–4) || Leary || Scurry (2) || 14,255 || 23–34
|- bgcolor="ffbbbb"
| 58 || June 13 || @ Mets || 0–2 || Lynch || Tunnell (1–3) || Sisk || 12,124 || 23–35
|- bgcolor="ccffcc"
| 59 || June 14 || @ Expos || 3–2 || Tekulve (2–5) || Lucas || — || 30,657 || 24–35
|- bgcolor="ffbbbb"
| 60 || June 15 || @ Expos || 0–1 || Schatzeder || DeLeon (3–4) || James || 23,247 || 24–36
|- bgcolor="ffbbbb"
| 61 || June 16 || @ Expos || 2–3 (11) || Reardon || Tekulve (2–6) || — || 24,626 || 24–37
|- bgcolor="ffbbbb"
| 62 || June 17 || @ Expos || 3–5 || Lea || McWilliams (3–5) || Reardon || 31,216 || 24–38
|- bgcolor="ffbbbb"
| 63 || June 19 || Cubs || 3–4 || Sutcliffe || Tudor (4–4) || Smith || 9,377 || 24–39
|- bgcolor="ccffcc"
| 64 || June 20 || Cubs || 5–1 || DeLeon (4–4) || Rainey || — || 7,767 || 25–39
|- bgcolor="ccffcc"
| 65 || June 21 || Cubs || 8–6 || Rhoden (5–5) || Eckersley || Tekulve (6) || 8,267 || 26–39
|- bgcolor="ccffcc"
| 66 || June 22 || Phillies || 10–3 || McWilliams (4–5) || Bystrom || — ||  || 27–39
|- bgcolor="ccffcc"
| 67 || June 22 || Phillies || 7–6 (13) || Scurry (1–3) || Campbell || — || 20,516 || 28–39
|- bgcolor="ffbbbb"
| 68 || June 23 || Phillies || 5–7 || Koosman || Candelaria (5–6) || — || 19,014 || 28–40
|- bgcolor="ffbbbb"
| 69 || June 24 || Phillies || 2–4 || Carlton || Tudor (4–5) || Holland || 17,749 || 28–41
|- bgcolor="ccffcc"
| 70 || June 25 || @ Cubs || 3–0 || DeLeon (5–4) || Rainey || — || 19,036 || 29–41
|- bgcolor="ccffcc"
| 71 || June 26 || @ Cubs || 9–0 || Rhoden (6–5) || Eckersley || — ||  || 30–41
|- bgcolor="ffbbbb"
| 72 || June 26 || @ Cubs || 8–9 || Bordi || McWilliams (4–6) || Smith || 28,369 || 30–42
|- bgcolor="ffbbbb"
| 73 || June 27 || @ Cubs || 7–8 (11) || Stoddard || Scurry (1–4) || — || 37,055 || 30–43
|- bgcolor="ffbbbb"
| 74 || June 28 || @ Giants || 3–4 (11) || Lavelle || Robinson (0–3) || — || 6,191 || 30–44
|- bgcolor="ffbbbb"
| 75 || June 29 || @ Giants || 0–3 || Robinson || Tudor (4–6) || — || 15,448 || 30–45
|- bgcolor="ffbbbb"
| 76 || June 30 || @ Giants || 5–7 || Williams || Guante (2–3) || Lavelle || 26,990 || 30–46
|-

|- bgcolor="ffbbbb"
| 77 || July 1 || @ Giants || 4–7 || Hammaker || Rhoden (6–6) || Minton || 15,731 || 30–47
|- bgcolor="ffbbbb"
| 78 || July 2 || @ Dodgers || 4–5 || Pena || McWilliams (4–7) || Niedenfuer || 28,986 || 30–48
|- bgcolor="ccffcc"
| 79 || July 3 || @ Dodgers || 6–0 || Candelaria (6–6) || Howell || — || 37,951 || 31–48
|- bgcolor="ffbbbb"
| 80 || July 4 || @ Dodgers || 0–9 || Hershiser || Tudor (4–7) || — || 46,747 || 31–49
|- bgcolor="ffbbbb"
| 81 || July 5 || @ Padres || 1–2 || Gossage || Scurry (1–5) || — || 14,907 || 31–50
|- bgcolor="ffbbbb"
| 82 || July 6 || @ Padres || 3–7 || Whitson || Rhoden (6–7) || — || 18,368 || 31–51
|- bgcolor="ffbbbb"
| 83 || July 7 || @ Padres || 0–1 || Dravecky || McWilliams (4–8) || Gossage || 28,995 || 31–52
|- bgcolor="ccffcc"
| 84 || July 8 || @ Padres || 4–3 || Candelaria (7–6) || Thurmond || Tekulve (7) || 17,950 || 32–52
|- bgcolor="ccffcc"
| 85 || July 12 || Giants || 6–3 || DeLeon (6–4) || Laskey || Tekulve (8) || 6,295 || 33–52
|- bgcolor="ccffcc"
| 86 || July 13 || Giants || 8–2 || Candelaria (8–6) || Krukow || — ||  || 34–52
|- bgcolor="ccffcc"
| 87 || July 13 || Giants || 4–3 (18) || Scurry (2–5) || Cornell || — || 22,167 || 35–52
|- bgcolor="ccffcc"
| 88 || July 14 || Giants || 6–2 || Rhoden (7–7) || Davis || — || 9,001 || 36–52
|- bgcolor="ccffcc"
| 89 || July 15 || Giants || 9–3 || Tudor (5–7) || Robinson || — || 13,078 || 37–52
|- bgcolor="ccffcc"
| 90 || July 16 || Dodgers || 4–1 || Walk (1–0) || Honeycutt || — || 9,044 || 38–52
|- bgcolor="ffbbbb"
| 91 || July 17 || Dodgers || 0–5 || Pena || DeLeon (6–5) || — || 10,134 || 38–53
|- bgcolor="ccffcc"
| 92 || July 18 || Dodgers || 5–2 || McWilliams (5–8) || Reuss || — || 13,473 || 39–53
|- bgcolor="ccffcc"
| 93 || July 19 || Padres || 5–1 || Candelaria (9–6) || Lollar || — || 10,048 || 40–53
|- bgcolor="ccffcc"
| 94 || July 20 || Padres || 4–3 || Rhoden (8–7) || Dravecky || Robinson (5) ||  || 41–53
|- bgcolor="ffbbbb"
| 95 || July 20 || Padres || 2–3 || Hawkins || Tudor (5–8) || Gossage || 18,007 || 41–54
|- bgcolor="ffbbbb"
| 96 || July 21 || Padres || 4–6 || Thurmond || Walk (1–1) || Gossage || 11,593 || 41–55
|- bgcolor="ffbbbb"
| 97 || July 22 || Padres || 1–5 || Whitson || DeLeon (6–6) || — ||  || 41–56
|- bgcolor="ccffcc"
| 98 || July 22 || Padres || 3–2 (11) || Winn (1–0) || Gossage || — || 22,971 || 42–56
|- bgcolor="ccffcc"
| 99 || July 24 || @ Expos || 12–5 (11) || Scurry (3–5) || Reardon || — || 28,087 || 43–56
|- bgcolor="ccffcc"
| 100 || July 25 || @ Expos || 3–1 || Rhoden (9–7) || Lea || Robinson (6) || 28,266 || 44–56
|- bgcolor="ffbbbb"
| 101 || July 26 || @ Expos || 4–5 || James || Robinson (0–4) || Reardon || 17,685 || 44–57
|- bgcolor="ffbbbb"
| 102 || July 27 || Cardinals || 2–3 (10) || Andujar || Tekulve (2–7) || Sutter || 9,740 || 44–58
|- bgcolor="ffbbbb"
| 103 || July 28 || Cardinals || 1–5 || Cox || DeLeon (6–7) || Sutter || 12,945 || 44–59
|- bgcolor="ffbbbb"
| 104 || July 29 || Cardinals || 3–4 || Allen || Candelaria (9–7) || Sutter || 12,501 || 44–60
|- bgcolor="ffbbbb"
| 105 || July 30 || Expos || 1–3 || James || Rhoden (9–8) || — || 6,212 || 44–61
|- bgcolor="ccffcc"
| 106 || July 31 || Expos || 5–3 || Tudor (6–8) || Rogers || Robinson (7) || 7,813 || 45–61
|-

|- bgcolor="ccffcc"
| 107 || August 1 || Expos || 4–0 || McWilliams (6–8) || Lea || — || 8,729 || 46–61
|- bgcolor="ccffcc"
| 108 || August 2 || Mets || 6–4 || Robinson (1–4) || Darling || — || 8,543 || 47–61
|- bgcolor="ffbbbb"
| 109 || August 3 || Mets || 1–4 || Terrell || Candelaria (9–8) || — || 7,783 || 47–62
|- bgcolor="ffbbbb"
| 110 || August 4 || Mets || 3–4 || Gorman || Scurry (3–6) || Orosco || 7,876 || 47–63
|- bgcolor="ffbbbb"
| 111 || August 5 || Mets || 1–3 (10) || Gardner || Robinson (1–5) || — || 10,575 || 47–64
|- bgcolor="ccffcc"
| 112 || August 6 || @ Cardinals || 3–2 || McWilliams (7–8) || Andujar || Tekulve (9) || 22,142 || 48–64
|- bgcolor="ffbbbb"
| 113 || August 7 || @ Cardinals || 1–2 || Cox || DeLeon (6–8) || Sutter || 18,146 || 48–65
|- bgcolor="ccffcc"
| 114 || August 8 || @ Cardinals || 6–4 || Candelaria (10–8) || Horton || Tunnell (1) || 18,325 || 49–65
|- bgcolor="ccffcc"
| 115 || August 9 || @ Mets || 11–0 || Rhoden (10–8) || Berenyi || — || 27,604 || 50–65
|- bgcolor="ccffcc"
| 116 || August 10 || @ Mets || 4–1 || Tudor (7–8) || Fernandez || Tekulve (10) || 28,355 || 51–65
|- bgcolor="ffbbbb"
| 117 || August 11 || @ Mets || 1–3 || Gooden || McWilliams (7–9) || Orosco || 28,326 || 51–66
|- bgcolor="ffbbbb"
| 118 || August 12 || @ Mets || 3–6 || Darling || DeLeon (6–9) || Gardner || 36,135 || 51–67
|- bgcolor="ffbbbb"
| 119 || August 14 || @ Braves || 1–3 || Camp || Candelaria (10–9) || Moore || 14,243 || 51–68
|- bgcolor="ffbbbb"
| 120 || August 15 || @ Braves || 3–7 || Bedrosian || Rhoden (10–9) || Garber || 12,957 || 51–69
|- bgcolor="ccffcc"
| 121 || August 16 || @ Braves || 5–2 || Tudor (8–8) || Mahler || — || 16,829 || 52–69
|- bgcolor="ffbbbb"
| 122 || August 17 || Astros || 4–7 (10) || Dawley || Tekulve (2–8) || — || 10,370 || 52–70
|- bgcolor="ffbbbb"
| 123 || August 18 || Astros || 0–5 || LaCoss || DeLeon (6–10) || — || 11,691 || 52–71
|- bgcolor="ffbbbb"
| 124 || August 19 || Astros || 3–4 || Niekro || Candelaria (10–10) || Dawley || 13,215 || 52–72
|- bgcolor="ffbbbb"
| 125 || August 20 || Braves || 1–4 (10) || Garber || Tekulve (2–9) || — || 7,613 || 52–73
|- bgcolor="ccffcc"
| 126 || August 21 || Braves || 5–4 || Robinson (2–5) || Dedmon || — || 6,400 || 53–73
|- bgcolor="ccffcc"
| 127 || August 22 || Braves || 7–2 || McWilliams (8–9) || Payne || — || 4,156 || 54–73
|- bgcolor="ffbbbb"
| 128 || August 24 || Reds || 0–2 || Russell || DeLeon (6–11) || — || 8,074 || 54–74
|- bgcolor="ccffcc"
| 129 || August 25 || Reds || 5–3 || Candelaria (11–10) || Tibbs || McWilliams (1) || 21,385 || 55–74
|- bgcolor="ccffcc"
| 130 || August 26 || Reds || 7–1 || Rhoden (11–9) || Price || — || 10,831 || 56–74
|- bgcolor="ffbbbb"
| 131 || August 28 || @ Astros || 2–3 || Smith || Tudor (8–9) || — || 11,016 || 56–75
|- bgcolor="ccffcc"
| 132 || August 29 || @ Astros || 4–2 || Robinson (3–5) || DiPino || — || 9,587 || 57–75
|- bgcolor="ffbbbb"
| 133 || August 30 || @ Reds || 1–4 || Tibbs || DeLeon (6–12) || — || 10,220 || 57–76
|- bgcolor="ccffcc"
| 134 || August 31 || @ Reds || 6–2 || Candelaria (12–10) || Price || Robinson (8) || 12,954 || 58–76
|-

|- bgcolor="ffbbbb"
| 135 || September 1 || @ Reds || 5–7 (11) || Power || Robinson (3–6) || — || 16,733 || 58–77
|- bgcolor="ffbbbb"
| 136 || September 2 || @ Reds || 1–7 || Robinson || Tudor (8–10) || — || 13,597 || 58–78
|- bgcolor="ccffcc"
| 137 || September 3 || @ Expos || 3–0 || McWilliams (9–9) || Rogers || Tekulve (11) || 12,333 || 59–78
|- bgcolor="ccffcc"
| 138 || September 4 || @ Expos || 5–3 || Scurry (4–6) || James || Tekulve (12) || 10,184 || 60–78
|- bgcolor="ffbbbb"
| 139 || September 5 || Mets || 2–4 || Berenyi || Tunnell (1–4) || Sisk || 3,569 || 60–79
|- bgcolor="ccffcc"
| 140 || September 6 || Mets || 2–0 || Rhoden (12–9) || Schiraldi || Scurry (3) || 3,529 || 61–79
|- bgcolor="ccffcc"
| 141 || September 7 || Cardinals || 4–1 || Tudor (9–10) || Horton || Scurry (4) || 4,077 || 62–79
|- bgcolor="ffbbbb"
| 142 || September 8 || Cardinals || 2–9 || Andujar || McWilliams (9–10) || — || 8,807 || 62–80
|- bgcolor="ffbbbb"
| 143 || September 9 || Cardinals || 1–2 || Cox || DeLeon (6–13) || Sutter || 7,460 || 62–81
|- bgcolor="ffbbbb"
| 144 || September 10 || Expos || 5–8 || Grapenthin || Tunnell (1–5) || Hesketh || 3,126 || 62–82
|- bgcolor="ccffcc"
| 145 || September 11 || Expos || 5–1 || Rhoden (13–9) || Bargar || — || 2,963 || 63–82
|- bgcolor="ffbbbb"
| 146 || September 12 || @ Mets || 0–2 || Gooden || Tudor (9–11) || — || 12,876 || 63–83
|- bgcolor="ccffcc"
| 147 || September 13 || @ Mets || 14–4 || McWilliams (10–10) || Terrell || — || 6,076 || 64–83
|- bgcolor="ccffcc"
| 148 || September 14 || @ Cardinals || 8–7 (12) || Robinson (4–6) || Sutter || Tekulve (13) || 16,292 || 65–83
|- bgcolor="ffbbbb"
| 149 || September 15 || @ Cardinals || 3–8 || LaPoint || Candelaria (12–11) || — || 17,356 || 65–84
|- bgcolor="ffbbbb"
| 150 || September 16 || @ Cardinals || 7–8 (10) || Hassler || Tunnell (1–6) || — || 21,918 || 65–85
|- bgcolor="ccffcc"
| 151 || September 18 || @ Cubs || 6–2 || Tudor (10–11) || Eckersley || Robinson (9) || 30,721 || 66–85
|- bgcolor="ccffcc"
| 152 || September 19 || @ Cubs || 11–6 || McWilliams (11–10) || Stoddard || Winn (1) || 31,585 || 67–85
|- bgcolor="ccffcc"
| 153 || September 20 || @ Cubs || 7–6 || Tekulve (3–9) || Smith || Candelaria (1) || 33,651 || 68–85
|- bgcolor="ccffcc"
| 154 || September 21 || Phillies || 5–1 || Scurry (5–6) || Koosman || — || 4,940 || 69–85
|- bgcolor="ccffcc"
| 155 || September 22 || Phillies || 2–1 (12) || Robinson (5–6) || Andersen || — || 6,927 || 70–85
|- bgcolor="ccffcc"
| 156 || September 23 || Phillies || 4–2 || Tudor (11–11) || Rawley || Candelaria (2) || 11,249 || 71–85
|- bgcolor="ffbbbb"
| 157 || September 24 || Cubs || 1–4 || Sutcliffe || McWilliams (11–11) || — || 5,472 || 71–86
|- bgcolor="ccffcc"
| 158 || September 25 || Cubs || 7–1 || DeLeon (7–13) || Patterson || — || 4,068 || 72–86
|- bgcolor="ffbbbb"
| 159 || September 26 || Cubs || 2–5 || Ruthven || Tunnell (1–7) || — || 3,365 || 72–87
|- bgcolor="ccffcc"
| 160 || September 29 || @ Phillies || 4–0 || Rhoden (14–9) || Hudson || — || 27,493 || 73–87
|- bgcolor="ccffcc"
| 161 || September 30 || @ Phillies || 2–0 || Tudor (12–11) || Denny || Robinson (10) ||  || 74–87
|- bgcolor="ccffcc"
| 162 || September 30 || @ Phillies || 7–2 || McWilliams (12–11) || Rawley || — || 17,292 || 75–87
|-

|-
| Legend:       = Win       = LossBold = Pirates team member

Roster

Opening Day lineup

Player stats
Batting
Note: G = Games played; AB = At bats; H = Hits; Avg. = Batting average; HR = Home runs; RBI = Runs batted in

Pitching
Note: G = Games pitched; IP = Innings pitched; W = Wins; L = Losses; ERA = Earned run average; SO = Strikeouts

Awards and honors 

Don Robinson, Hutch Award
1984 Major League Baseball All-Star Game
Tony Peña, C, reserve

Transactions 
 November 7, 1983 – Jim Bibby granted free agency.
 November 7, 1983 – Miguel Diloné granted free agency.
 November 7, 1983 – Richie Hebner granted free agency.
 November 7, 1983 – Dave Parker granted free agency.
 November 7, 1983 – Kent Tekulve granted free agency.
 November 7, 1983 – Dave Tomlin granted free agency.
 November 12, 1983 – Sold Bob Owchinko to the Cincinnati Reds.
 November 22, 1983 – Signed Jeff Little as a free agent.
 November 22, 1983 – Signed Andy Rincon as a free agent.
 December 6, 1983 – Traded Mike Easler to the Boston Red Sox. Received John Tudor.
 December 19, 1983 – Signed Amos Otis as a free agent.
 December 22, 1983 – Signed Kent Tekulve as a free agent.
 January 12, 1984 – Signed Dave Tomlin as a free agent.
 January 17, 1984 – Drafted Gil Heredia in the 1st round (16th pick) of the 1984 amateur draft (January), but did not sign the player.
 January 17, 1984 – Drafted Jay Buhner in the 2nd round of the 1984 amateur draft (January Secondary). Player signed May 26, 1984.
 January 17, 1984 – Drafted Tom Prince in the 4th round of the 1984 amateur draft (January Secondary). Player signed May 24, 1984.
 January 17, 1984 – Drafted Alex Cole in the 11th round of the 1984 amateur draft (January), but did not sign the player.
 February 1, 1984 – Signed Joe Charboneau as a free agent.
 March 4, 1984 – Signed Jim Neidlinger as an amateur free agent.
 March 28, 1984 – Signed Kelly Paris as a free agent.
 March 31, 1984 – Released Gene Tenace.
 April 3, 1984 – Signed Bob Walk as a free agent.
 May 19, 1984 – Signed Mitchell Page as a free agent.
 June 4, 1984 – Drafted Eric Hetzel in the 1st round (13th pick) of the 1984 amateur draft (June Secondary), but did not sign the player.
 June 4, 1984 – Drafted Barry Jones in the 3rd round of the 1984 amateur draft.
 June 4, 1984 – Drafted Wes Chamberlain in the 5th round of the 1984 amateur draft, but did not sign the player.
 June 4, 1984 – Drafted Gordon Dillard in the 7th round of the 1984 amateur draft (June Secondary), but did not sign the player.
 June 4, 1984 – Drafted Stu Cole in the 19th round of the 1984 amateur draft, but did not sign the player.
 June 21, 1984 – Signed Hipolito Pena as a free agent.
 August 5, 1984 – Released Amos Otis.

Farm system

Notes

References 
 1984 Pittsburgh Pirates at Baseball Reference
 1984 Pittsburgh Pirates at Baseball Almanac

Pittsburgh Pirates seasons
Pittsburgh Pirates season
Pitts